Wafa Mahjoub is a Tunisian karateka. She won the silver medal in the women's 61 kg event at the 2022 Mediterranean Games held in Oran, Algeria. She won one of the bronze medals in the women's 61 kg event at the 2021 Islamic Solidarity Games held in Konya, Turkey.

In 2021, she competed in the women's 61 kg event at the World Karate Championships held in Dubai, United Arab Emirates.

Achievements

References

External links 
 

Living people
Year of birth missing (living people)
Place of birth missing (living people)
Tunisian female karateka
Competitors at the 2022 Mediterranean Games
Mediterranean Games medalists in karate
Mediterranean Games silver medalists for Tunisia
Islamic Solidarity Games medalists in karate
Islamic Solidarity Games competitors for Tunisia
21st-century Tunisian women